Wall Literary Journal is an annually published literary magazine founded in 2001 featuring selected works from Saddleback College students. It publishes short stories, poetry, personal narratives, photography, and artwork. A printed copy of the journal circulates on campus at the start of Saddleback's Fall Semester. Unlike many other college and university literary journals, WALL only accepts submissions from students currently enrolled at Saddleback College. Staff members consist of Saddleback College students and are responsible for reviewing and selecting student submissions, layout and design, proofing, copy editing, and publicity.

Awards and acclaim
2017
American Scholastic Press Association
Most Outstanding Community College Literary-Art Magazine 
First Place with Special Merit Magazine Award

2016
American Scholastic Press Association
1st Place with Special Merit Magazine Award

Community College Humanities Association
2nd Place, Best Magazine Award, Pacific-Western Region

2015
American Scholastic Press Association
1st Place, Magazine Award: WALL Literary Journal

Community College Humanities Association
Pacific-Western Region Division
3rd Place, Creative Nonfiction: Jilly Pretzel, “Chicken” 
2nd Place, Artwork: Anibal Santos, "El Nahual"

2014
Community College Humanities Association
Pacific-Western Division Literary Competition (sponsored by the Community College Humanities Association)
Second Place awarded to "Experimentation" by Sterling Arthur Leva
Second Place awarded to "Good Habits" by Ellen Rose

2013
American Scholastic Press Association
First Place among campus literary magazines

2012
American Scholastic Press Association
First Place among campus literary magazines

“One of the Best New Literary Magazines in the nation” – The Community College Humanities Association, 2001

Masthead
The WALL staff is broken down into five committees: Short Story, Poetry, Essay, Art, and Publicity.  Each committee, excluding Publicity, is headed by an editor.  All staff members are managed by the Editor-in-Chief and Faculty Advisor (a professor at Saddleback College).

 Charles (Harry) H.M. Foster  Editor-in-Chief (2019)
 Brooke Campbell -  Editor-in-Chief (2017)
 Karen Renee Bailey - Editor-in-Chief (2016)
 Matthew Durham - Editor-in-Chief (2015)
 Sterling Arthur Leva - Editor-in-Chief (2014)
 Alexander Kusztyk – Editor-in-Chief (2013)
 Denise Blike – Editor-in-Chief (2012)
 Jaclyn Fauls – Editor-in-Chief (2011)
 Erik Adams – Editor-in-Chief (2010)

 Gina Shaffer – Current Faculty Advisor
 Amy Sterling Casil – Former Faculty Advisor
 Suki Fisher – Former Faculty Advisor
 Josh Pryor - Former Faculty Advisor

See also
 List of literary magazines

References

External links
WALL Literary Journal Homepage
Saddleback College
South Orange County Community College District

Literary magazines published in the United States
Student magazines published in the United States
Magazines established in 2000
Magazines published in California
Annual magazines published in the United States